Taher (Al-Tahir), is Algerian city, the industrial center of Jijel Province, with its industrial area of Ouled Salah, the airport of Achouat-Ferhat Abbas and the port of Djen Djen.

Situation
The municipality of Taher is located in the north of Jijel Province.

Localities of the town
Taher is composed of several locations:
  
 
 Bazoul
 Laajarda
 Belmamouda
 Beni Metrane
 Bouazem
 Laghjara
 Taher
 Bouachir
 Boubzrène
 Boulzazène
 El Kedia
 Dekkara
 Demina
 
 Aïn El Hammam
 Boulachour
 Boucherka
 Merdj El Bir
 Ouled Salah
 Ouled-Souici
 Oued Nil
 Oum Djelal
 Tablalte
 Dar El Oued
 T'Har oussaf
 Tleta

History
The present city is located on the site of an ancient city - dating back to Ottoman period - it was built on aboriginal lands hunted in the nearby mountains, after the revolt of 1871 (see Mokrani Revolt) time of occupation of Algeria by France, whose population was expropriated, including: the plain of Oued Djen-djen, Telata, the Ouled Bel Afou, Wadi Nile Beni Afar, Beni Siar, Beni khatab, and the immediate vicinity of the current city

Personalities
 Ferhat Abbas, first president of the Provisional Government of the Algerian Republic.
 Dekhli Mokhtar, one fighter of the FLN in Taher and the Algerian east.

References

External links

  Jijel news

Communes of Jijel Province
Cities in Algeria
Algeria